Ruhot is a village in the municipality of Peja. It is located in a larger region which is known as Rrafshi i Dugagjinit, famous for its fertile land and beautiful nature. White Drin flows along the whole north side of the village and is used as a source of water for crops.

Notes

References 

Villages in Peja